The 2000 Enggano earthquake struck at 23:28 local time on June 4 with a moment magnitude of 7.9 and a maximum Mercalli intensity of VI (Strong). The event occurred off the coast of southern Sumatra, Indonesia near Enggano Island. There were more than 100 fatalities and up to 2,585 injuries. Over 730 aftershocks shook the area afterwards, one just eleven minutes after the mainshock.

This was the first and southernmost in a series of very large to great Sumatran earthquakes in the 2000s to rupture almost the entire western part of the Sunda megathrust, most notably including the 9.1–9.3 2004 Indian Ocean earthquake, but also the 8.7 2005 Nias–Simeulue earthquake, and the 7.9–8.4 September 2007 Sumatra earthquakes.

Background and tectonics
Indonesia is well known for strong earthquakes: the 2000 Enggano event marked the beginning of an ongoing period of seismic activity in the area, highlighted by the 2004 Indian Ocean earthquake. The 2000 Enggano earthquake took place at the southeastern end of the fault segment that ruptured during the 1833 Sumatra earthquake. This group of earthquakes, in addition to the 2005 Nias–Simeulue earthquake, all ruptured along the megathrust that forms the interface between the Australian and Sunda Plates. This event was the only one not to cause a tsunami.

Earthquake
The earthquake involved the rupture of two different faults with different mechanisms. The first subevent ruptured a north–south striking fault within the Australian Plate with a left lateral strike-slip mechanism. The earthquake rupture propagated northwards until it reached the megathrust, triggering the second subevent along the Sunda megathrust itself. The strike-slip rupture probably represents slip on a pre-existing fracture zone, similar to the likely cause of the M 7.9 earthquake that struck about 1,000 km to the south on 18 June 2000 with a similar mechanism.

Damage and casualties
Extensive damage and landslides populated the Bengkulu area, with minor injuries and damage on Enggano Island. In the village worst struck, several hundred structures were reported in ruins. An aftershock measuring 6.2 struck on June 7.

Aftermath and response
International relief teams arrived in the region within several days. Relief efforts were impeded by fallen telephone poles, which blocked the supplies. The main problem found in the affected areas was a lack of water supply and electricity, these facilities having been cut off by oscillation.
Pope John Paul II expressed his "sincere sympathy" for those families stricken by the earthquake. He called for a rapid international response to the quake, and said he would keep its victims in his prayers. A Taiwanese rescue team was sent to help victims of the tremor, the first from the country to take part in rescue efforts aside from Asia. The United States donated US$ 25,000 instantly to relief organizations, Japan offering a grant of US$140,000 and Australia US$143,000 in addition to a two-person team of emergency relief examiners.

Wharton Basin event

At the time, it was the largest intraplate earthquake in the Indian Ocean until the 2012 Indian Ocean earthquakes.

See also
 List of earthquakes in 2000
 List of earthquakes in Indonesia

References

Further reading

External links
 M7.9 Enggano Island-Bengkuku Earthquake, 2000 – Amateur Seismic Centre
 
 

Enggano earthquake
Earthquakes in Indonesia
Enggano earthquake
Enggano earthquake
Bengkulu
Landslides in Indonesia
2000 disasters in Indonesia